Ann Mary Dussault (born May 23, 1946) is an American politician in the state of Montana. She served in the Montana House of Representatives from 1974 to 1981. She later served as a county official for Missoula County, Montana.

References

1946 births
Living people
Politicians from Missoula, Montana
Michigan State University alumni
Montana State University alumni
Women state legislators in Montana
Democratic Party members of the Montana House of Representatives
21st-century American women
LGBT women
LGBT state legislators in Montana